The Iron River depot was built by the Chicago, Milwaukee, St. Paul and Pacific Railroad—better known as the Milwaukee Road—in 1913. Located in Iron River, Michigan, the brick depot has a modified Neoclassical design and is rectangular in shape. The depot has a covered porch on one end that connected to the waiting room. The station agent's office was located in the middle of the building, and a freight room was on the other end.

The CNW railroad came to the Upper Peninsula of Michigan to serve the local iron mines and timber industry, and built a branch line that terminated in Iron River in 1913. Passenger service connected to the main line at Channing, Michigan until it ended in 1945; the railroad provided bus service between Sagola, Michigan and Iron River until 1956. The railroad ceased bus service in 1956. The depot was sold to a local produce company for use as a warehouse. The depot was subsequently sold to an equipment company. In 1993, the depot was sold again. The new owners rehabilitated the depot and turned it into a restaurant and bakery. The new owners also bought two old ex-Long Island Railroad passenger coaches and added them to the depot as part of a railroad-themed restaurant, but has since closed after the death of one owner.

The depot was listed on the National Register of Historic Places because of its architecture and also because of its association with the development of Iron River. It is also significant as the last remaining railway station in Iron River.

References
Christensen, Robert O. Chicago, Milwaukee and Saint Paul Railway Iron River Depot (Iron County, Michigan). National Register of Historic Places Registration Form on file at the National Park Service, Washington, DC, 2007.
 National Park Service, Washington, DC.

Railway stations on the National Register of Historic Places in Michigan
Iron River, Michigan
Former railway stations in Michigan
Railway stations in the United States opened in 1914
Railway stations closed in 1956
National Register of Historic Places in Iron County, Michigan